The peak of Mount Hillaby is the highest point on the Eastern Caribbean island of Barbados.  The peak is located in the parish of Saint Andrew. It immediately overlooks the area known as the Scotland District to the north and east which comprises geologically old sediments prone to erosion.

References

External links
 Mount Hillaby & the Scotland District - The UNESCO World Heritage Centre website
 Mount Hillaby - The Paek Visor website

Landforms of Barbados
Saint Andrew, Barbados
Landmarks in Barbados
Mount Hillaby